Johnny Sei-Hoe Hon (born 22 December 1971) is a Hong Kong businessman and politician. He is the founder of the Global Group, which he established after working at ABN AMRO Bank in Hong Kong. He is most known for his media ventures and work as an executive producer in the film and television industry, as well as live theater.

Early life and education 
Johnny Hon was born in Hong Kong on 22 December 1971 to Hon Tak Sun, and Wong Ling (Betty). He is the eldest of their two sons. Hon now has four daughters and one son. At age 13, Hon left Hong Kong to study at Uppingham School in the United Kingdom. In 1990, he went on to attend King's College London and graduated in 1993. Hon then attended Hughes Hall, Cambridge where he obtained his PhD in Psychiatry. He also holds an M.A. degree in Korean Studies studied at The School of Oriental & African Studies.

Career 
After obtaining his PhD, Hon began his career in the private banking sector at ABN AMRO Bank in Hong Kong. He left private banking in 1997 and established Global Group International Holdings Ltd., which developed into an international venture capital company involved in banking, biotechnology, education, entertainment, leisure, financial services, financial technology, gaming, media, mining, oil and gas, property development and sports.

Global Group's media and entertainment investments include a number of international projects such as W, a biographical drama produced by Oliver Stone that explored the life and presidency of George W. Bush.  He was also executive producer of the film Fagara written and directed by Heiward Mak, Protégé produced by Derek Yee, and the TV drama series in China, Da Ren Wu (2006–07). 

Hon is also involved in the theatre business, and worked as executive producer with Michael Linnit and Michael Grade on the revival of Sunset Boulevard starring Glenn Close. He was also executive producer of the West End musical, 42nd Street (musical).

Hon has investments in fine art, wine collection, and horse racing. He has recently hired French jockey, Gerald Mossé, as his principal rider for his stable of over 40 horses in the United Kingdom and internationally.

Philanthropy 
The Global Group is a sponsor of educational funds and scholarships in both China and UK, including for University of Oxford and Peking University. The educational scholarships were created to open up opportunities for Chinese students. In July 2015, Hon was awarded the Medal of Honour from the Government of Hong Kong SAR for his contributions to the Lok Sin Tong Benevolent Society, Kowloon.

In early 2018, Hon donated to the New Countryside Construction Project in Xiaping Village, which is located in Yunfu City within China's Guangdong Province. The construction project increased government investment in agriculture, expanding rural areas and the fiscal coverage of rural areas and infrastructure.

Politics 
Hon has involvement in a range of diplomatic and political projects. He holds official positions within four governments.

Armenia
In 2012, Hon was appointed adviser to the Minister of Economy of Armenia.

China
Hon is a member of the 12th Heilongjiang Provincial Standing Committee, Chinese People's Political Consultative Conference (CPPCC). He is a former Member of the 10th Heilongjiang Provincial CPPCC, the 11th Heilongjiang Provincial CPPCC, and a former Member of the 6th Yunfu Municipal Committee, CPPCC as well the 5th Yunfu Municipal Committee, CPPCC.

Further, Hon is an Economic Adviser for a number of local governments within China, including the People's Government of Jilin Province and the People's Government of Yuyao City in Zhejiang Province.

Grenada
Hon is the Ambassador-at-large for Grenada and the Honorary Consul of Grenada in Hong Kong.

Hong Kong SAR (China)
Hon has been a long-standing member of the New People's Party (NPP) in Hong Kong since it was established in 2011 by Regina Ip Lau Suk-yee GBS JP, and was appointed as a Vice Chairman of the Party in January 2019.

North Korea
In 2007, Hon said, “No prize in the world is as prestigious as the ‘International Kim Il Sung Prize. As chairman of the International Kim Il Sung Foundation, I will make every possible effort to carry out the noble cause started by the President, deeply aware of the mission I have assumed before the times and humankind.’” The International Kim Il Sung Prize is an award conferred for contributions to the study and dissemination of the Juche idea.

Saint Vincent and the Grenadines
In 2002, Hon was the Commercial Representative for Saint Vincent and the Grenadines in Hong Kong and Singapore.

Arms
Hon was granted arms by the Lord Lyon Court in 2018.

Publications 
 Hon, J., Huppert, F.A., Holland, A.J. and Watson, P. (1998) The value of the Rivermead Behavioural Memory Test (Children's Version) in an epidemiological study of adults with Down's syndrome. British Journal of Clinical Psychology, 37: 15–29
 Holland, A.J., Hon, J., Huppert, F.A., Stevens, F. and Watson, P. (1998) A population-based study of the prevalence and presentation of dementia in adults with Down's syndrome. British Journal of Psychiatry, 172: 493–498
 Hon, J., Holland, A.J., Huppert, F.A. and Watson, P. (1999) Neuropsychological assessment of older adults with Down's syndrome: an epidemiological study using the Cambridge Cognitive Examination (CAMCOG). British Journal of Clinical Psychology, 38: 155–165
 Rubinzstein, D., Hon, J., Stevens, F., Pyrah, L., Tysoe, C., Huppert, F.A., Easton, D.F. and Holland, A.J. (1999) ApoE genotype and risk of dementia in Down's syndrome. Neuropsychiatric Genetics, 88B (4): 344–347
 Holland, A.J., Hon, J., Huppert, F.A., Stevens, F. and Watson, P. (2000) The incidence and course of dementia in people with Down's syndrome: Findings from a population-based study. Journal of Intellectual Disability Research, 44 (2): 138–146
 Ball, S.L., Holland, A.J., Huppert, F.A., Treppner, P., Watson, P. and Hon, J. (2004) The modified CAMDEX informant interview is a valid and reliable tool for use in the diagnosis of dementia in adults with Down's syndrome. Journal of Intellectual Disability Research, 48 (6): 611–620
 Ball, S.L., Holland, A.J., Hon, J., Huppert, F.A., Treppner, P. and Watson, P. (2006) Personality and behaviour changes mark the early stages of Alzheimer's disease in adults with Down's syndrome: findings from a prospective population-based study. International Journal of Geriatric Psychiatry, 21 (7): 661–673
 Landt, J., Ball, S.L., Holland, A.J., Hon, J., Owen, A., Treppner, P. and Herbert, J. (2011) Age-Related Changes in Plasma Dehydroepiandrosterone Levels in Adults with Down's Syndrome and the Risk of Dementia. Journal of Neuroendocrinology, 23 (5): 450–455

References

External links
Johnny Hon – Official Website
Global Group International Holdings Ltd. – Official Website

1971 births
Living people
Alumni of St. Paul's Co-educational College
People educated at Uppingham School
Alumni of King's College London
Alumni of Hughes Hall, Cambridge
Hong Kong film producers
Hong Kong theatre people
Hong Kong writers
New People's Party (Hong Kong) politicians